Balerna railway station is a railway station in the Swiss canton of Ticino and the municipality of Balerna. The station is on the Swiss Federal Railways Gotthard railway, between Lugano and Chiasso.

Services 
 the following services stop at Balerna:

References

External links 
 
 

Railway stations in Ticino
Swiss Federal Railways stations